"Touch and Go" is the second single by post-punk band Magazine, released on 14 April 1978. A non-album single, it did not appear on their debut album, Real Life, released two months later.

Recording
Unlike with previous single "Shot By Both Sides", the band recorded "Touch and Go" with their complete five-man lineup including (ex-St. Louis Union) keyboardist Dave Formula, who had joined shortly after the release of the first single. However, "Touch and Go" was also the last single to  feature original drummer Martin Jackson, who left in July 1978, after a British tour, subsequently replaced by Paul Spencer, who lasted a short time and was then replaced by John Doyle. Jackson later joined The Chameleons and Swing Out Sister.

Content
The single's B-side, "Goldfinger", is a cover of the James Bond theme of the same name. Both songs were featured as bonus tracks on the CD reissue of Real Life.

Music video
A promo video was released for the song.

Track list
Side A
 "Touch and Go" (Devoto/McGeoch) – 2:50

Side B
 "Goldfinger" (Barry/Bricusse/Newley) – 3:20

References

1978 singles
Magazine (band) songs
Songs written by Howard Devoto
1978 songs
Virgin Records singles
Song recordings produced by John Leckie
Songs written by John McGeoch